Antilla may refer to:

Places
 Antilla, Cuba, a municipality and town
 Antilla, Salta, a village and rural municipality in northwestern Argentina
 La Antilla, a beach resort in Andalusia, Spain

Ships
 USS Antilla (1904), a US Navy cargo ship
 SS Antilla (1939), a Hamburg America Line cargo ship scuttled by her crew off Aruba in 1940

People
 Susan Antilla, freelance journalist

Other
 Antilla (plant), a genus of plants in the family Orchidaceae
 Antilla Records, several record labels based in New York and Miami

See also
 ANTILLAS I, a fiber optic submarine communications cable between the Dominican Republic and Puerto Rico
 Antillia, a mythical island in the Atlantic Ocean
 Antilia (building), world's most expensive home
 Antila, a surname
 Anttila (disambiguation)